The Resurrectionists is a 2000 horror novel by Kim Wilkins. It is the story of Maisie Fielding who, bored with her job and family, returns to England to research her grandmother, who is a "white witch".

Background
The Resurrectionists was first published in Australia in 2000 by HarperCollins in trade paperback format. It was re-published in Australia and the United Kingdom in mass market paperback format in 2001 and in 2003 was published in e-book format. The Resurrectionists won the 2000 Aurealis Award for best horror novel.

References

External links

2000 Australian novels
Australian horror novels
Aurealis Award-winning works
HarperCollins books